Syed Ali Raza is a Pakistani businessman and author. He became the President of the National Bank of Pakistan, being the longest serving President of the bank up to that point, and has also worked at the North African branch of Bank of America.

Biography
Raza was born to Syed Hashim Raza. He graduated from London School of Economics with Bachelor of Science in economics. He also holds a Master of Science in Administrative Sciences from Cass Business School and a graduate degree from Karachi Institute of Business Administration.

While serving as the President of the National Bank of Pakistan, Raza eliminated over 3,000 jobs and closed 250 branches, raising the bank's profits and lowering its bad loans.

In 2006, BusinessWeek included Raza in their list of the "25 Stars of Asia", ranking him among the top 4 financiers in Asia. Raza has also been given a Sitara-e-Imtiaz by the President of Pakistan, the highest award a citizen can receive.

Raza resigned from his post in 2012 for unstated reasons.

References

External links
National Bank of Pakistan

Living people
Pakistani businesspeople
Alumni of the London School of Economics
Pakistani bankers
Sadiq Public School alumni
Pakistani financiers
Alumni of Bayes Business School
Year of birth missing (living people)
Recipients of Sitara-i-Imtiaz